Saves the World is the second studio album by American band Muna, released through RCA Records on September 6, 2019. The album was promoted by the singles "Number One Fan", "Who", "Stayaway", and "Taken", receiving positive reviews.

Background
After supporting English singer Harry Styles during his 2017–2018 tour, the band took a hiatus until lead singer Katie Gavin concocted the opening verse of the song "Number One Fan" six months later, starting the album's songwriting process. According to guitarist Josette Maskin, the album title represents the band's belief that "saving yourself is the key to saving the world". Maskin also said Saves the World was meant to evoke optimism in listeners.

Music and lyrics
Saves the World is a pop, alternative rock, synth-rock, indie pop, synth-pop, electropop, alt-pop, and power pop album. Thematically autobiographical, Saves the World has been described as "an emotional excavation." Its lyrics depict explorations of "addiction", "alienation", "romantic desolation", and "cycles of abusive behavior". The band approached the album with the intention of crafting a minimalist sound, with musically shorter sentences in comparison to those in their first album.

Release and promotion
"Number One Fan" was released as the lead single from the album on June 7, 2019, followed by the releases of "Who" and "Stayaway" on June 28 and August 16, respectively. Saves the World was released on September 6, 2019. Muna embarked on a tour within the United States from September to October 2019 in promotion of the album.

Critical reception
Saves the World garnered "rave reviews" upon its release. At Metacritic, which assigns a normalized rating out of 100 to reviews from mainstream critics, the album holds an average score of 82 based on eight reviews, indicating "universal acclaim".

In a perfect five-star review, Alexandra Pollard of The Independent asserted that Saves the World set up the band to joining "the ranks of those who have brazenly borrowed their sound". Rolling Stones Jonathan Bernstein awarded the album four stars out of five and praised its "concise and clever" yet "never overly precious" songwriting. Writing for Pitchfork, Eve Barlow highlighted how the album was "as sentimental as it is versatile". Marcy Donelson of AllMusic  commented that while the album's lyrics were more effective than its hooks, it contained "a handful of low-key anthems".

Saves the World placed on several critics' lists of the best albums of 2019. It was ranked as the 41st best by Billboard, the 33rd by The Guardian, the 15th by The Independent, and included on an unranked list by Paper.

Track listing

Charts

Release history

References

2019 albums
RCA Records albums
Muna (band) albums
Alternative rock albums by American artists
Electronic rock albums by American artists